Michael Xavier Campion (born ) is a former Hong Kong professional footballer who played as a midfielder. He is of English and Filipino descent.

Club career

HKFC
Campion played part-time football for HKFC while working as a wine importer. He scored his first league goal in HKFC's 2:4 defeat by Rangers. He scored his second goal against Kitchee in the final match of the season.

Citizen
He gave up his full-time job to concentrate on his football career upon joining Citizen. Campion claimed that he had a stable job working for a wine importer with good income. But he had to entertain clients and he would rather enjoy football and pursue his football dream while he is still young. Michael is very excited about representing Citizen in the 2012 AFC Cup.

Pegasus
On 6 June 2013, it was reported by the Apple Daily that he had signed for the ambitious Pegasus for the upcoming season.

South China
On 13 January 2015, news emerged that Michael Campion had agreed on a deal to join South China on loan for the second half of the season and would wear the number 3 jersey.

Honours

International
Hong Kong
Guangdong-Hong Kong Cup: 2013

References

External links
White Collar to Pro Soccer Interview with Michael Campion
Necescity.com interview Banker to HK Footballer
Citizen FC profile 
Michael Campion at HKFA
Preston Athletic FC profile

1984 births
Living people
English footballers
Filipino footballers
Hong Kong footballers
Hong Kong First Division League players
Hong Kong Premier League players
Hong Kong FC players
Citizen AA players
TSW Pegasus FC players
South China AA players
Hong Kong people of English descent
Hong Kong people of Filipino descent
Association football midfielders